Lists of ancient kings are organized by region and peoples, and include kings recorded in ancient history (3000 BC – 1700 AD) and in mythology.

Southern Europe

Greeks

Historical 

 Lists of rulers of Greece
 List of ancient Greek tyrants
 List of kings of Argos
 Kings of Sparta
 Kings of Macedon
 Attalid dynasty
 List of the kings of Epirus

Mythological 

 List of kings of Argos
 List of kings of Athens

Italy 

 List of Etruscan rulers

Romans 

 List of Roman kings
 List of Roman emperors
 List of Byzantine emperors
 Roman Emperors during the Fall of the Western Empire
 List of Roman client rulers

Balkans 

 List of rulers of Illyria
 List of rulers of Thrace and Dacia
 List of Paionian kings

Northern Europe 

 List of rulers of the Huns

British Isles 
 Lists of monarchs in the British Isles

Britain 
 King of the Britons
 List of kings of the Picts
 List of kings of Dumnonia
 List of rulers of Wales
 List of monarchs of Powys

Ireland 
 List of High Kings of Ireland (largely mythological for ancient times)
 Kings of Ailech
 List of kings of Connacht
 Kings of Uí Maine (semi-historic in ancient times)
 List of kings of Ulster

Germanics 

 List of Frankish kings
 Kings of the Burgundians
 List of kings of the Lombards
 Kings of the Angles
 List of Anglo-Saxon monarchs and kingdoms

Northern Africa 

 Magonids
 List of kings of Numidia
 List of kings of Mauretania
 List of kings of Cyrene

Egypt 

 List of pharaohs
 Abydos King List
 Karnak king list
 Turin King List

Nubia 

 List of monarchs of Kerma
 List of monarchs of Kush

Ethiopia 

 List of kings of Axum
 List of legendary monarchs of Ethiopia

Near East 

 List of rulers of Saba and Himyar

Mesopotamia
List of Mesopotamian dynasties
Sumerian King List
List of kings of Akkad
List of kings of Babylon
List of Assyrian kings
List of kings of Mari
List of rulers of Mitanni

Syria and Canaan 
 List of Canaanite rulers
 List of kings of Ebla
 Kings of Ugarit
 List of rulers of Aleppo
 List of kings of Tyre
 Aramean kings
 List of Syrian monarchs
 List of rulers of Damascus
 List of Nabataean kings
 List of Palmyrene monarchs

Jews 
 Kings of Israel and Judah
 Kings of Judah
 Kings of Hasmonean Judea

Anatolia 

 List of Hittite kings
 List of Neo-Hittite kings
 List of kings of Urartu
 List of Kings of Lydia
 List of rulers of Cappadocia
 List of rulers of Paphlagonia
 List of rulers of Commagene
 List of Kings of Pontus
 List of rulers of Bithynia
 List of kings of Galatia

Caucasus 

 List of Armenian kings
 List of Georgian monarchs

Iran 

 List of rulers of Pre-Achaemenid kingdoms of Iran
 List of rulers of Elam
 List of kings of Persia
 List of Seleucid rulers
 List of Parthian kings
 List of rulers of Parthian sub-kingdoms
 Kings of Characene
 List of shahanshahs of the Sasanian Empire

Far East 

 List of Emperors of Japan
 List of monarchs of Vietnam
 Monarchy of Cambodia
 List of early and legendary monarchs of Burma

Indian Subcontinent 

 List of Indian monarchs
List of Kuru dynasty rulers
 Mahajanapada
 List of Mauryan rulers
 List of Tamil monarchs
 List of Brihadratha dynasty rulers
 List of rulers of Bengal
 Legendary early Chola kings (mythological)
 List of rulers of Odisha
 List of rulers of Malwa
 List of Manipuri kings
 List of Sinhalese queens

China 

 List of Chinese monarchs
 List of Chinese leaders
 Kings of the Han dynasty
 List of emperors of the Han dynasty
 List of emperors of China's Northern Dynasties
 List of emperors of China's Southern Dynasties
 List of emperors of the Tang dynasty
 List of emperors of the Liao dynasty
 List of emperors of the Ming dynasty
 List of Yuan emperors
 List of Northern Yuan khans
 List of emperors of the Qing dynasty

Korea 
 List of monarchs of Korea
 List of legendary monarchs of Korea (mythological)
 List of Mahan confederacy monarchs (mythological)
 List of Gija Joseon monarchs (mythological)
 List of Wiman Joseon monarchs

Americas

Maya 

 Rulers of Calakmul (no actual king-list; must be dug out of text)
 Lords of Caracol
 List of rulers of Copan
 List of the rulers of Dos Pilas
 Rulers of Dos Pilas
 Kʼicheʼ kingdom of Qʼumarkaj  (no actual king-list; must be dug out of history)
 Rulers of Motul de San José
 Rulers of Palenque
 List of rulers of Piedras Negras
 Rulers of Quiriguá
 Rulers of Tikal
 Yaxchilan rulers

Valley of Mexico 
 List of rulers of Tenochtitlan
 List of rulers of Tetzcoco
 List of rulers of Tlacopan

Incas 
 Rulers of Cusco and the Inca Empire

kings